San Antonio is a metro station on Line 7 of the Mexico City Metro. It is located in the  Benito Juárez borough. In 2019, the station had an average ridership of 14,502 passengers per day.

Name and pictogram
The station is located on the intersection of Avenida San Antonio and Avenida Revolución, close to the Periférico freeway, from which it takes its name. The station's pictogram depicts the outline of Saint Anthony of Padua and a child, representing innocence.

History
The station opened on 19 December 1985 as part of the third stretch of Line 7, going from Tacubaya to Barranca del Muerto, the latter station being the southern terminus of the line.

From 23 April to 17 June 2020, the station was temporarily closed due to the COVID-19 pandemic in Mexico.

General information
San Antonio serves the San Pedro de los Pinos and Santa María Nonoalco neighborhoods. It is also possible to reach the Estadio Azul and the Plaza de Toros México bullring from the station, which is around 1 km away from the sports facilities.

Ridership

Nearby
Estadio Azul, sports facility.
Plaza de Toros México, bullring.

Exits
West: Av. San Antonio and Av. Revolución, Nonoalco
East: Av. Revolución and Tintoreto, Nonoalco

Gallery

References

External links 
 

San Antonio
Railway stations opened in 1985
1985 establishments in Mexico
Mexico City Metro stations in Benito Juárez, Mexico City
Accessible Mexico City Metro stations